Noel Katz is an American composer, lyricist, and bookwriter for musical theatre.

He is best known for  Such Good Friends, which was presented at the fourth annual New York Musical Theatre Festival, where it won five awards, including Talkin’ Broadway’s Citation as the season’s best musical 
, and Our Wedding, The Musical, which was featured in The New York Times in 2003 after Mr. Katz composed an entire musical for his own actual wedding.

Mr. Katz is also a specialist in theatrical improvisation. He has taught at Artistic New Directions’ Summer Improv Retreat and currently teaches at The People’s Improv Theatre. He has composed scores for a variety of Second City (NY) improv-based revues, including We Built This City on Rent Control, A Time For Heroes and Hoagies, and Generation F’d.  He has also taught song improvisation at Fairleigh Dickinson University, Circle in the Square and the National Dance Institute.

Works 

 Through the Wardrobe
 Murder at the Savoy
 The Heavenly Theatre (composer)
 The New U.
 On the Brink
 Not a Lion
 The Christmas Bride
 The Company of Women
 Spilt Milk
 The Pirate Captains
 The Making of "Larry: The Musical"
 The Love Contract
 Area 51
 Our Wedding
 Couplets (composer)
 Such Good Friends
 Learning Curve, a short musical film created as part of Ripfest #11 (lyricist/screenwriter)

External links 
 www.weddingmusical.com The Wedding Musical Website
 Our Wedding at TheaterMania.com
 Theatre Mania Review of NYMF 2007 and "Such Good Friends"
 Broadway World Review of "Such Good Friends"
 Edge New York Review of "Such Good Friends"
 Back Stage Review of "Such Good Friends"
 New York Sun Review of "Couplets"
 Interview with Noel Katz, at NYC Tourist.com
 Noel Katz Biography at MusicalWriters.com
 Interview with Noel Katz about the musical "Area 51" at The Thunder Child website.
 "Pirate Captains" Cast Album

References

American musical theatre composers
American musical theatre lyricists
Living people
Year of birth missing (living people)